Vidalita is a 1949 Argentine comedy film directed and co-written by Luis Saslavsky and produced by Emelco. Considered transgressive for the time, it stars Mirtha Legrand as the title character, a girl who cross-dresses as a gaucho to be able to take charge of her grandfather's estate. Fernando Lamas stars as the captain of the fort, who falls in love with Legrand's character "to the point that he is willing to marry her without knowing if she is a man or a woman".

Cast
 Mirtha Legrand
 Narciso Ibáñez Menta
 Fernando Lamas
 Amalia Sánchez Ariño
 Oscar Valicelli
 Milagros de la Vega
 Leticia Scury

Reception
The film was poorly received by the media related to Peronism. According to Saslavsky, they "find that a gaucho represented by a girl in disguise is a lack of machismo, of criollismo." Writing for Página/12s LGBT periodical Soy in 2022, Adrián Melo stated:
In a key scene, Vidalita-Legrand finds herself in the situation of sharing a room where Lamas bathes naked and in another she dances with him in front of a people who are shocked to see two passionate men together. Only for this 1949 film directed by Luis Saslavsky, Legrand would deserve to enter the eternal sky with stars of the LGTBIQ world.

There is probably nothing in Argentine cinematography—neither before nor after—so deliciously erotic and transgressive in relation to sexual dissidence, nor so subversive in dealing with two founding topics of nationality and local hegemonic masculinity: being a gaucho and being a soldier.

Raúl Manrupe and María Alejandra Portela described it as a "mythical work and an accursed classic." In 2022, it ranked 51st in the list of The 100 Greatest Films of Argentine Cinema, a poll organized by the specialized magazines La vida útil, Taipei and La tierra quema, which was presented at the Mar del Plata International Film Festival.

See also
 List of Argentine films of 1949
 List of LGBT-related films

References

External links
 

1949 films
1940s Spanish-language films
Argentine black-and-white films
Argentine musical comedy films
1949 musical comedy films
1940s Argentine films